Lyudmyla Kichenok and Nadiia Kichenok were the defending champions, but chose to participate at the WTA Elite Trophy instead.

Lenka Kunčíková and Karolína Stuchlá won the title, defeating Kateřina Siniaková and Renata Voráčová in an all-Czech final, 6–4, 6–2.

Seeds

Draw

References 
 Draw

Engie Open Nantes Atlantique - Doubles